Fontenelle Dam was built between 1961 and 1964 on the Green River in southwestern Wyoming. The dam and reservoir are the central features of the Seedskadee Project of the U.S. Bureau of Reclamation, which manages the Fontenelle impoundment primarily as a storage reservoir for the Colorado River Storage Project. The dam suffered a significant failure in 1965, when the dam's right abutment developed a leak. Emergency releases from the dam flooded downstream properties, but repairs to the dam were successful. However, in 1983 the dam was rated "poor" under Safety Evaluation of Existing Dams (SEED) criteria, due to continuing seepage, leading to an emergency drawdown. A concrete diaphragm wall was built through the core of the dam to stop leakage.

Use
Initially conceived as a storage reservoir for irrigation water, the project was suspended for a time in 1962 to pursue a study of high-altitude irrigation methods. The results of the studies caused the cancellation of many irrigation features for the project. The primary project rationale evolved to support Wyoming water rights in the Colorado River basin, retaining water that would otherwise go downstream to states in the lower Colorado basin. The dam provides power generation as a secondary feature. One motivation for the deferral of irrigation activities was the discovery of trona in the southern portion of the proposed irrigated region. As the extraction of trona was a higher-value activity, the removal of those lands from the project made the irrigation project nonviable.

Construction
Development of the upper Green River basin was included in a 1946 Bureau of Reclamation report on the Colorado River basin. A 1950 supplementary report dealt with details of the proposed Seedskadee Project, followed by another addendum in 1953. The Colorado River Storage Project, including the Seedskadee Project, was authorized by Congress in 1956. Work was stopped on irrigation  infrastructure in 1962. The dam featured unusually large outlet works, capable of discharging  (compared with a spillway capacity of ) because the outlet works could be increased in size at lower cost than the spillway.

The first element of construction at Fontenelle Dam was the building of the Fortenelle community, the base camp for construction, with work starting in 1961 to build prefabricated relocatable houses for dam workers. The contract for the base camp was awarded to and completed by the D.H. Butcher & Co. construction company. The construction contract for the dam was awarded on June 13, 1961 to Foley Brothers, Inc. and the Holland Construction Company of St. Paul, Minnesota, with construction starting on June 30, at a cost of $7.9 million. The exposed rock was not prepared or smoothed with concrete. The foundation grouting required an unusually large amount of material to fill cracks in the upper , with additional grouting required at the right abutment and outlet works. Work on the dam was completed by the end on 1963, with final completion on April 24, 1964. Work on the powerplant started in 1963, with completion in 1965.

Partial failure
Problems with the embankment became apparent in May 1964, when part of the backfill slid into the stilling basin downstream, attributed to too-fast lowering of the reservoir level. In July 1965 another slide occurred in the area of the stilling basin. 

A significant leak appeared on September 3, 1965 at the west abutment, starting as a wet spot that grew with time.  The weakened downstream face lost  of material that slid into the stilling basin, accompanied by continuing water flow, a condition known as "hydraulic piping."  Work began the next day to lower the reservoir, with a 24-hour watch on the dam. The wet spot became a waterspout, flowing at a rate of between 10 and 12 million gallons per day.  

Further collapse could have created a breach in the dam, leading to total failure. Leakage did not increase during the incident. The emergency release of water flooded areas along the Green River downstream, damaging ranches and homes.

The reservoir was drawn down further during the remainder of the year, and work began on repairs to the embankment, along with an intensive program of pressure-grouting at the abutment and down the centerline of the dam embankment. Work continued through 1966, with a complete replacement of the right abutment embankment. The reservoir was partly refilled in the spring of 1967 to check the efficacy of the grouting work, which consumed  of grout. Water was released through the power penstock with the turbine and generator removed while the  outlet works were repaired. Twenty-three observation wells were drilled at this time. The reservoir was fully refilled in the summer of 1968. 

Subsequent evaluations described failure as "narrowly averted." The near-failure was not widely reported, but did cause organizations, other than the Bureau of Reclamation, to change their design and construction practices for embankment dams. The Bureau of Reclamation concluded that water used in mixing concrete was contaminated with trona. The Bureau concluded that the sodium carbonate in the trona accelerated setting of the grout in the original grout curtain, leaving it weak and fissured.

Safety evaluation
As a result of the catastrophic failure of the closely similar Teton Dam under much the same circumstances in 1976, the Safety Evaluation of Existing Dams (SEED) program was initiated in the late 1970s and early 1980s. The 1983 report on Fontenelle Dam rated the dam "poor," the second-lowest rating. The report noted increasing seepage, similar in nature to the seepage that caused the 1965 failure. However, in May 1985, operators initiated an emergency drawdown of the reservoir after deciding that the dam was "in very serious distress." With the fast drawdown, slumping appeared on the upstream face. The reservoir was entirely drained. The reservoir was to be kept empty in 1986, but heavy spring runoff carried logs and tumbleweeds into the reservoir, clogging the outlet works. The reservoir partially filled, preventing flooding in the town of Green River, but creating anxiety about possible failure of the dam, which was retaining fifty feet of water, rising at times five feet in a day. An environmental assessment of the repair program noted that the only alternative was an intentional and permanent breaching of the center section of the dam, leaving local industries without water. The test section of wall was completed, and a full-length wall was considered, but the completed section appeared to have solved the leakage problem.

See also
 Teton Dam, a similar design which failed catastrophically in 1976 under similar circumstances after a leak developed at the dam's abutment when the reservoir was filled.

References

External links
 Fontenelle Dam at the U.S. Bureau of Reclamation
 Seedskadee Project at the U.S. Bureau of Reclamation
 Fontenelle Powerplant at the U.S. Bureau of Reclamation
 Fontenelle Dam failure case study at the Association of State Dam Safety Officials

Dams in Wyoming
Hydroelectric power plants in Wyoming
Buildings and structures in Lincoln County, Wyoming
Buildings and structures in Sweetwater County, Wyoming
Colorado River Storage Project
United States Bureau of Reclamation dams
Dams completed in 1964
Dams in the Green River (Colorado River tributary) basin